Behror is a city, near Alwar City in the Kotputli-Behror district of Rajasthan. It serves as the administrative headquarters of the eponymous Behror tehsil. Situated 61 km east of Alwar City, the district headquarters, 120 km south-west of national capital, New Delhi, and part of the National Capital Region, it also comes under National Capital Region Planning Board, a federal authority for urban planning purposes in the region. It is clubbed under Shahjahanpur-Neemrana-Behror Complex in the National Capital Region, which includes 137 revenue villages. In this cluster, Behror municipality is the largest urban conglomeration. This region is also known as 'Ahirwal region' and serves as an industrial hub for the state of Rajasthan. Behror municipality, spread out over an area of 15 km2, is divided into four revenue villages, namely Behror tarf Gangabishan, Behror tarf Doongrasi, Behror tarf Nainsukh, and Behror tarf Balram.

Economy 
Behror's economy supports more than 225,000 jobs and features industrial areas like Keshwana Industrial Area, Sotnala Industrial Area, and RIICO Industrial Zone.

Logistics hub 
The donnectivity Of NH-8 and dedicated freight corridor and major industrial development, and rapid growth in industries expanding in the city. This made Behror a logistics hub and made it the center for blossoming businesses transporting goods from industrial areas to the nearest port for export. The Indian government started developing the Rapid Rail Transit System (RRTS), Dedicated Freight Corridor Railway Station, Delhi-Mumbai Electric Highway, SNB Logistic Center, which will reshape and diversify the economy of Behror. According to some, these developments will generate more than 800,000+ jobs in Behror and nearby towns by 2025.

Trading 
For decades, Behror has been a major hub for wholesale trading of general goods, which attracts business from nearby towns.

Industrial development, tourism, trading, hotels, and resorts are the major contributors to the economy.

Behror is a fast-growing city well-known for its diversified economy. It is also a logistics hub that connects via rail, roads, and metro.

Behror is the closest city to the industrial city Neemrana, where a large proportion of land is allocated by authorities for industrial development. More than 87 Japanese companies and SEZs operate there. Its close proximity and comparatively lower cost of living make Behror attractive to employees of the industrial sector in Neemrana.

Real Estate 
Behror real estate projects include:
 Oasis Green (RERA Approved)
 Manglam Rambagh (RERA Approved)
 SNB Avenues (RERA In Process)
 Krishna City (RERA Approved

Tourism 
Behror's proximity to hill stations boosts tourism in the city. Popular attractions include Neemrana Fort & Exotic Resorts, amongst others.

Logistics 
Behror is a city full of industries and wholesale markets in nearby towns, which generates demand for logistics support and services to transport the goods from various industries to the ports and other parts of India.

Toponym 
According to the most commonly accepted legend, the name "Behror" is thought to be derived from a corruption of the word "Bhairun" in the name "Mohalla Bhairunpura". Mohalla Bhairunpura was named after Bhairun temple in the newly established Shaliwahpur by King Shalivahana.

History 
Several late Harappan period pottery and archaeological artefacts have been found in and around the Sahibi River basin.

In the sixth century AD, King Shalivahan of the Bhati clan ruled the northern part of the current Alwar region, north-west of Sahibi River. After King Mauradhwaj, Shaliwahan took over his reins and shifted his capital – Mauradhwaj town – on the banks of the then-perennial Sahibi River to the north-west of it, and established two cities, Kot and Shaliwahapur, with the capital being Shaliwahpur. Kot's remains are found in Singhali village of Mundawar tehsil. Shaliwahpur later came to be known as Behror city.

Before Independence, Behror was a tehsil and urban center under Alwar princely state. During the reign of Rao Pratap Singh (ruler of Alwar), Behror and surrounding Bansur area were incorporated in Alwar princely state.

In first freedom movement, Pran Sukh Yadav, who fought along with Rao Tula Ram against the British in 1857 Freedom Struggle at the battle of Naseebpur near Behror in Narnaul, hailed from Behror Tehsil and was important in raising local population of Aheers against British.

After independence, and in the subsequent accession of Alwar state to Indian Union on 1 July 1947 it became part of newly formed Republic of India.

In 1948, it became part of the United States of Matsya under Indian Union, which was formed through a covenant with Union Government of India by states of Alwar, Bharatpur, Dholpur, and Karauli, with capital being Alwar.

In 1949, these were again merged with other princely states of Rajputana to form Rajasthan and through this Behror came to be part of Rajasthan state.

In 1953, Behror along with Alwar were again considered to be included in to be formed Brij Pradesh or Greater Delhi by State Reorganisation Commission but those proposals were never implemented and subsequently dropped.

Behror has remained important center of attraction in Ahirwal region and as a part of the larger Matsya region due to proximity to Delhi.

Geography
Located at co-ordinates . with an average elevation of  Behror sits amidst a plain of very fertile agricultural land with the Aravali Range mountains running north–south approximately five kilometers west of Behror.

According to the Central Ground Water Authority (CGWA), Behror has been identified as an area where withdrawal of ground water needs regulation. The regions lacking surface water resources puts a strain on its ground water, but the CGWA claims that proper management will result in sufficient water supply. Sahibi River, an ephemeral river, flows 10 km south-east of Behror, flowing south-west to north-east. Sota River is seven kilometers to the south-west of Behror and drains into the Sahibi river.

The climate is mostly dry, consisting of summers, winters and short rainy seasons. Winter lasts from November until March, summer from March to July. January is the coldest month, when it may get as cold as 2 °C. Around four-fifths of the average rainfall is received in July, August and September.

The soil is highly fertile and agriculture is one of the main occupations in the region. Mattiyar, a loamy soil, is the most common type found in Behror. The chiknot type of soil is commonly found in Alwar district is characteristically not found in Behror and Tijara tehsils.

The city falls under Seismic Activity Zones 4 with some area of the tensils under Zone 3 and others under Zone 4.

Forests are mainly of deciduous hilly type found along tracts of the Aravalli hills. The dominant trees are kikar, neem and dhak. The main mineral found is quartz. There have been rapid changes in the environment surrounding the city due to rapid urbanisation and increased pollution.

Demographics 
According to the 2011 Indian Census, Behror Municipality had a population of 29,531. Of this population, 15,570 were males and 13,961 were females. Children between the age of 0 to 6 years were 3770, which was 12.77% of the total population. Female sex ratio was 897. The total number of literates in Behror was 21,656, which constituted 73.33% of the total population, with male literacy 80.04% and female literacy 65.85%. The effective literacy rate of the 7+ population of Behror was 84.1%, of which male literacy rate was 92.4% and female literacy rate was 75.1%. The Scheduled Castes and Scheduled Tribes had a population of 4,466 and 940 respectively. Behror municipality had total administration over 5,484 houses.

The population of Behror fell in the first decades of the 20th century due to influenza outbreaks in 1918, a plague outbreak in 1907, and deaths of enlisted soldiers in Rajputana units in the battlefields of World War I and China War in 1900; indeed this was true of most of Alwar state and Rajputana.

Languages
Hindi, the official language of Rajasthan, is the official language of the city. But this border area's most common vernacular language – Raathi/Ahirwati – has influences of Standard Hindi, Haryanvi / Bangru, and Mewati. It is most influenced by Bangru, and seems rough to people not used to it.

Administration
Behror Semi-Urban area comprises Behror Municipality and surrounding rural areas.

Behror City is a Class 3 municipal town according to the Rajasthan Government classification system and is proposed to become a Regional Centre city.

Eponymous Behror Tehsil is an administrative unit comprising Behror city and surrounding gram panchayats/villages. Behror Legislative constituency is the political constituency including Behror city and surrounding villages for election of representative to State legislature.

Behror municipality 
The Behror municipality – which is Behror city proper – is divided into 25 wards for which elections are held every five years.

Behror Legislative Constituency 
Behror Legislative Constituency is categorised as a rural seat in the Legislative constituency classification. There are a total of  voters in the seat, which includes  male voters, and  female voters. In the 2018 Rajasthan elections, Behror recorded a voter turnout of 74.69%. In 2013 the turnout was 76%, and in 2008 it was 69%.

Behror Tehsil 
Behror Tehsil comprises 62 gram panchayats and 64 Patwar circles with ILR Code – 5.

Culture/Cityscape

Landmarks and monuments

Forts 

Neemrana Fort complex, located 10 km away, is the most important landmark. The Neemrana fort was built in the 16th century and was occupied by Chouhan Rajputs until 1947.

Taseeng Fort, located in the Aravali hills five kilometers away, is another attraction, but is now in poor condition due to neglect. It was last occupied by Bargurjar clan. Before them Chouhans from Machedi were its inhabitants.

Temples
Mansa Devi Temple in Dahmi is thronged by devotees during Navratris. It is 637 years old.

Jeelani Mata Mandir built 500 years ago located behind Kutchery is another historical temple.

Culture and festivals
The Rath cattle fair is organised in May for the improvement of the Rath breed in Alwar district.

Transportation 
Behror municipality is well connected to major urban conglomerations in the area.

Roadways
The most important connecting road is NH-8 (NH – 48) which passes through the city, connects it to Delhi to the northeast and Jaipur to the southwest. This important link is a part of the Golden Quadrilateral project of NHAI. Recently NH-8 h
underwent a major development and now it has a six-lane road from Jaipur to Delhi. RTDC-run Hotel Midway was situated on NH-8 in Behror before it was closed down.

Behror is midway between Jaipur and Delhi, 130 km from the state capital and 120 km from the national capital.

Behror also has direct connectivity to the district capital, Alwar, which is 60 km away. Behror tehsil borders Haryana's Mahendragarh/Narnaul district and is connected to Narnaul City by State Highway – 14 which then reaches district headquarters Alwar.

MDR (Major District Road) – 78 road connects Behror municipality to Rewari and ICD at Kund.

Railways
Behror has two railways that connect the town to Delhi, Jaipur and other major cities in India. It is the last stop of the Rapid Rail Transit System (RRTS).

The nearest railway station is Narnaul railway station 25 km away on the Phulera-Rewari-Delhi Railway Line. Inland Container Depot is being developed near Kund Railway station of Behror Tehsil under DMRC project.

Airways 
The nearest airport is Indra Gandhi International Airport which is 110 km towards Delhi on Jaipur- Delhi Highway. Another international airport is proposed at Kotkasim which is only 50 km away.

See also 
 Neemrana

References

Cities and towns in Alwar district